Mexico first participated at the Olympic Games in 1900 and has sent athletes to compete in every Summer Olympic Games since 1924. Mexico has also participated in several Winter Olympic Games since 1928, though has never medaled in the Winter Olympics.

Mexican athletes have won a total of 73 medals with diving as the top medal-producing sport.

The National Olympic Committee for Mexico is the Mexican Olympic Committee and was created in 1923.

Mexico did not win any medals at the Winter Olympics.

Hosted Games 
Mexico was the first Latin American nation to host the Olympic Games on one occasion.

Medals

Medals by Summer Games

Medals by Winter Games

Medals by Summer Sport

List of medalists

Summer Olympics

Multiple Mexican Olympic medalists 

Joaquín Capilla is the Mexican athlete with the most medals, four, and  the first Mexican athlete to obtain medals in three consecutive games, while Humberto Mariles is the  only double Olympic champion, also the Mexican athlete with the most medals at a single Olympic games, with three in 1948, and got Mexico's first gold medal.

In 2016, María Espinoza became the first Mexican female athlete to win a medal in three consecutive games.

See also 
 List of flag bearers for Mexico at the Olympics
 :Category: Olympic competitors for Mexico
 Mexico at the Paralympics
 Sport in Mexico

External links